Orient Forest Regional Natural Park (French: Parc naturel régional de la Forêt d'Orient) is a protected area of woodlands and lakes in the Champagne-Ardenne region of France. It covers a total area of  The parkland encompasses the large Forêt d'Orient National Nature Reserve and three man-made lakes: Lac d'Orient, Lac du Temple and Lac Amance. The area was officially designated as a regional natural park in 1970.

Member communes
The park includes the following member communes:
 Amance • Argançon • Assencières
 Blaincourt-sur-Aube • Bossancourt • Bouranton • Brévonnes • Briel-sur-Barse • Brienne-la-Vieille • Brienne-le-Château
 Champ-sur-Barse • Chauffour-lès-Bailly • Courteranges
 Dienville • Dolancourt • Dosches
 Épagne
 Géraudot
 Jessains • Juvanzé
 Lassicourt • Laubressel • Lesmont • La Loge-aux-Chèvres • Lusigny-sur-Barse • Luyères
 Magny-Fouchard • Maison-des-Champs • Maizières-lès-Brienne • Mathaux • Mesnil-Saint-Père • Mesnil-Sellières • Molins-sur-Aube • Montiéramey • Montreuil-sur-Barse
 Onjon
 Pel-et-Der • Piney • Précy-Notre-Dame • Précy-Saint-Martin • Puits-et-Nuisement
 Radonvilliers • Rosnay-l'Hôpital • La Rothière • Rouilly-Sacey
 Saint-Christophe-Dodinicourt • Saint-Léger-sous-Brienne
 Thennelières • Trannes
 Unienville
 Val-d'Auzon • Vauchonvilliers • Vendeuvre-sur-Barse • Villemoyenne

Lakes
The three man-made lakes offer sport and leisure activities for visitors and a home to animals. The largest, Lac d'Orient, covers  beside two marinas and three sand beaches.

See also
 List of regional natural parks of France

References

External links

 Official park website 
 Official park website 

Regional natural parks of France
Geography of Aube
Protected areas established in 1970
Tourist attractions in Aube